Cinema Italiano is one of 3 original songs that were written for the 2009 film Nine, an adaption of the 1982 musical of the same name. It is sung by Kate Hudson's character, and written by Maury Yeston who penned all the songs from the musical.

Conception
Incontention notes "Hudson’s Vogue journalist Stephanie was expanded considerably for the film", and AllMusic explains the song was written "allowing for a newly created part for Hudson to play".

She is an "avid fan of Guido Contini's movies -- but for all the wrong reasons. She loves the style over the content."

Maury Yeston explained the motivation behind the character and the purpose of the song within the context of the film:

Production
Producer and choreographer John DeLuca explained the song's production:

Synopsis
Incontention  explains: "Her song kicks in during an attempt at seducing Daniel Day-Lewis’s crisis-stricken filmmaker Guido Contini and is meant to reflect the flashbulb-popping chic and panache of the entertainment industry, and certainly, Stephanie’s place in that shallow world."

Critical reception
Some reviewers did not understand that the song was a critique of how many magazine writers write about the topics they know nothing about, and instead pinned the character's inaccurate and stereotypical description of Italian cinema on the songwriter. For example one critic wrote "it’s obvious, from the lyrics, that the song’s writer knows very little about Italian cinema.". Incontention wrote "I would say it stands out as the most catching tune of the piece, but it’s also the most out of place and has some fairly trite lyrics (and some odd rhythm shifts)". ReelViews wrote ""Cinema Italiano," is enjoyable; it just doesn't seem to belong. And Guido's near-dalliance with her occurs at a critical point during his marital strife when it is unlikely he would be interested in pursuing any woman other than Luisa. Stephanie disappears from the movie after this, to reappear only when everyone gathers for a fantasy sequence near the end. " PopSugar said " I've had Kate Hudson singing "Cinema Italiano" stuck in my head ever since I caught a sneak preview of Nine. "

References

2009 songs
Compositions by Maury Yeston
Songs written for films
Songs about Italy